Dipsacaster is an extinct genus of sea stars in the family Astropectinidae. It was described by Alcock in 1893, and is known from France and Morocco. It contains the species D. jadeti and D. africanus.

References

External links
 Dipsacaster at the Paleobiology Database

Astropectinidae
Fossil taxa described in 1893
Prehistoric animals of Africa
Prehistoric animals of Europe
Prehistoric starfish genera